Shadabad may refer to:
 Shadabad-e Mashayekh, East Azerbaijan Province
 Shadabad-e Olya, Kermanshah Province
 Shadabad-e Olya, East Azerbaijan
 Shadabad-e Sofla, Kermanshah Province
 Shadabad, Tehran